Little RES Q is Ontario's first CRA registered charity dedicated to the rescue, rehabilitation and relocation of pet turtles in an attempt to keep them from being released into the wild. The rescue also takes on snakes, bearded dragons, and other reptiles to help them find forever homes.

History
Founded in 2008 by Marc Ouellette, the rescue started as a dedicated aquatic turtle shelter in Toronto, Ontario and has since grown to have locations across Ontario and Quebec and now accepts in most legal reptiles as space permits.

See also 
 Ontario Society for the Prevention of Cruelty to Animals

References

 Scarborough apartment a haven for abandoned turtles
 Partnerships help save animals' lives
 Audrey spent the first 20 years of her life living in a bucket
 Trending Now: Audrey the turtle joins social media
 Tartaruga passa 20 anos em balde e vira exemplo de superação no Facebook
 Audrey the turtle gets second chance at life after spending first 20 years in a bucket
 Interview with Reptile Apartment
 Bell Employee Newsletter-In the spotlight
 What can you do to help stop the spread of invasive species in Ontario?
 Turtle Rescue and Rehabilitation
 Turtle Resources
 KTTC would like to give a round of applause to three generous donors
 KTTC's Don’t Shop – Adopt

External links
 
 Ontario Ministry of Natural Resources
 Turtle Tally
 Ontario Nature

Animal welfare organizations based in Canada
Non-profit organizations based in Toronto
Organizations established in 2008